According to Keyne’s Psychological Law of Consumption, Consumption is a function of income. In his words; “Human is disposal by nature, as income increases, consumption expenditure also increases but increase in consumption is smaller than the increase in income”. Mathematically C= f(y) ; i.e. C = a + b(y), Where a = Autonomous Consumption, b = MPC and Y = Income

In Keynesian macroeconomics, the Fundamental Psychological Law underlying the consumption function states that marginal propensity to consume (MPC) and marginal propensity to save (MPS) are greater than zero(0) but less than one(1)
MPC+MPS = 1

e.g. Whenever national income rises by $1 part of this will be consumed and part of this will be saved

References
.

Keynesian economics